Canoeing and Kayaking were held at the 1990 Asian Games in Beijing, China from October 2 to October 5. Men's and women's competition were held in Kayak and men's competition in Canoe. The competition included only sprint events.

Medalists

Men

Women

Medal table

References 

 New Straits Times, October 3–6, 1990

External links 
 Olympic Council of Asia

 
1990 Asian Games events
1990
Asian Games
1990 Asian Games